(of Guaraní origin) is an infusion of  (botanical name Ilex paraguariensis) prepared with cold water, a lot of ice and pohá ñaná (medicinal herbs), and in a slightly larger vessel. This infusion has its roots in Pre-Columbian America, which established itself as traditional during the time of Governorate of Paraguay. The Guaraní people call this infusion ka'ay, where ka'a means herb and y means water. There's also a variant made with juice, called "Juice tereré" or "Russian tereré", depending on the region. On December 17, 2020, UNESCO declared the tereré of Paraguay as an intangible cultural heritage, which includes the drink (tereré) and its preparation methods with medicinal herbs (pohá ñaná).

It is similar to  —a drink also based on yerba mate—but with the difference that tereré is consumed cold, preferably in the warmer areas of the Southern Cone. It is traditional from Paraguay, where it's considered a cultural icon. In recent decades it has become popular in some areas of Southern Brazil, in Eastern Bolivia and in Argentina (countries where the tereré of juice is more popular than the tereré of water).

Both refreshing or medicinal herbs are often added, such as pererina, cocú, mint, sarsaparille, horsetail family, burrito, agrial or wax begonia, batatilla, verbena, spikesedges, ajenjo, slender dayflower, escobilla, lemon balm, saffron crocus, ginger, taropé, perdudilla blanca and others. Currently, in Paraguay exist various franchises that sell flavored ice based on medicinal-refreshing weeds/fruits for consumption in the tereré.

The tereré was declared the official drink of Paraguay and also the Cultural Heritage of the Nation. Every last saturday of february the "National Tereré Day" is celebrated. By Resolution 219/2019, the National Secretariat of Culture declared the Traditional Practices and Knowledge of the Tereré in the culture of the Pohã Ñana as the National Intangible Cultural Heritage. On the other hand, the city of Itakyry is the permanent headquarters of the "Festival of Tereré" since 1998.

History 

Originally consumed by the Guaraní, its use was adopted during the Guaraní-Jesuit Missions time in the area of their missions. Tereré was spread by the emigrants, and has been a social beverage for centuries. The area of the Guaraní-Jesuit Missions has a fairly hot climate and this drink is believed to refresh the body and can be a very low-calorie, non-alcoholic beverage. Additionally, it is an important ritual signifying trust and communion.

Many people drink  with added herbs, both medicinal and refreshing. In northeastern Argentina it is commonly prepared either with water, medicinal herbs and ice cubes (called  (tereré prepared with water)) or citrus, as in south-western Brazil, with fruit juices like lemon, lime, orange, or pineapple. This practice varies depending on the region, for example, in the Formosa Province (Argentina), as well in the majority of Paraguay, it is normally prepared with medicinal herbs. In Southern Paraguay it is often prepared with citrus juice.

 are containers that can be made from animal horns, commonly made from cattle horns, stainless steel, wood,  (a kind of cucurbit native from South America), or silver. Metal  are often covered with leather. New  or those not used for some time need to be wet before use, because the lower part is usually capped with a round piece of wood, which expands and prevents leaks after being filled with water.

Preparation 

Most preparations of  begin by filling a  2/3 to 3/4 full of yerba mate. Then, ice cubes are added to water and usually stored in a vacuum flask. If herbs or juice are part of the preparation, they are added to the water at this point. The liquid is refilled as desired.

Local customs 

In Argentina,  is usually prepared with citrus juice and its consumption is increasing throughout the country, especially during the summer months, especially among younger millennials.

An investigation revealed that more than 90 percent of the Qom consume  frequently throughout the day.

Due to the hot climate,  is popular throughout the Central-West and Northern region of Brazil and is often prepared with a variety of juices, although coffee is still the most popular beverage in Brazil.

See also

 Mate con malicia
 List of Brazilian dishes

References

Further reading 
 Asunción 1537: Madre de la gastronomía del Río de la Plata y de Matto Grosso do Sul. Vidal Domínguez Díaz (2017).
 Poytáva: Origen y Evolución de la Gastronomía Paraguaya. Graciela Martínez (2017).

Herbal tea
Paraguayan cuisine
Intangible Cultural Heritage of Humanity
Yerba mate drinks
Cold drinks